Akhi Brotherhoods (Akhiya or Young Brotherhood) were a crucial part of the urban development and infrastructure of early Ottoman history. The brotherhoods were formed out of the medieval Islamic futuwwa organizations. The purpose of each brotherhood was to provide an infrastructure for production and trade in the town in which it was set up and provide a social framework for the men of town.

Structure
The brotherhoods were led by a Young Brother or Akhi who was chosen by all the other men of the brotherhood to be the leader. This man was typically unmarried, but could also be a married man or even a city elite. In some cases, the Akhi could even be someone who already held a high government position himself. The Akhi was responsible for building and furnishing the city hospice. He was also the one to entertain guests when they visited and stayed at the hospice. The members of the brotherhood were called Fityán (youths) and would work during the day and bring their money back to the Akhi once they had finished in the afternoon. This money was then used to further stock the hospice with food and other necessities. If there were no travelers, the members would eat in the evening and then repeat the same process the next day. However, if there was a traveler in town, he would be housed at the hospice and the food bought would go to him every day until he left to continue his travels.

The brotherhoods were set up in newly conquered Ottoman towns and could be found throughout Anatolia in every town and village. In some cases, such as in Bursa, the brotherhood could fully set up within a town in around five years. but it took time to develop influence amongst the people and recruit members. Even in situations where the city that had been conquered was not previously Muslim, the Akhi Brotherhoods were still able to gain influence, Bursa once again being an example of this. The brotherhoods supported the working class, but also many Akhi’s had the influence of elites.

Disposition and beliefs
The men of the brotherhood were generally very well-mannered and generous as they ascribed to the ideas of chivalry and virtue put forth in the Futuuwa. Ibn Battuta described them as “men so eager to welcome strangers, so prompt to serve food and to satisfy the wants of others, and so ready to suppress injustice and kill tyrannical agents of police and the miscreants who join with them.” Many of the brotherhoods formed their fellowship through documents similar to a “futuwwatnames” which preached virtues like modesty, self-control and denial.

Influence
The brotherhoods had an important role in the formation of early Ottoman society and in the creation of the janissaries. During times of transition in the central government, the Akhi would take control of their city and try to avoid too much damage as the power transitioned to the next regime.  They would also control much of the trade and production in the town, thus having a solid control on the economic regulation. They were essentially the Ottomans “clean up force” as they would move into a town and settle it. They held such tremendous power in some places that local Christian guilds were often forced to merge with the brotherhoods for their own livelihoods. This allowed the brotherhoods to quickly take control of the areas urban areas.

Dissolution
Eventually, the Akhi Brotherhoods became trade guilds and lost their autonomy as they became elements of the central state. As trade became more international or at least under a larger scope, the brotherhoods were no longer able to control the economy of a particular town or region. The system worked till roughly the end of the 16th century.

Masonic Akhi Order
The Military and Mystic Orders of Akhis is a masonic progressive order established in the United Kingdom. Membership is by invitation, and members must be subscribing of a regular Craft Lodge and subscribing a Mark Master Masons Lodge.

References 

Society of the Ottoman Empire